Anna Kekezović (née Punko; born 27 March 1989) is a Russian handball player for MTK Budapest and the Russian national team.

References

1989 births
Living people
Russian female handball players
Sportspeople from Krasnodar
Expatriate handball players
Russian expatriate sportspeople in Hungary
Russian expatriate sportspeople in Spain
20th-century Russian women
21st-century Russian women